Pavol Hurajt (born 4 February 1978) is a Slovak former biathlete.

Biathlon results
All results are sourced from the International Biathlon Union.

Olympic Games
1 medal (1 bronze)

*The mixed relay was added as an event in 2014.

World Championships

*During Olympic seasons competitions are only held for those events not included in the Olympic program.
**Mixed relay was added as an event in 2005.

References

External links
 
 
 
 

1978 births
Living people
Sportspeople from Poprad
Slovak male biathletes
Biathletes at the 2006 Winter Olympics
Biathletes at the 2010 Winter Olympics
Biathletes at the 2014 Winter Olympics
Olympic biathletes of Slovakia
Medalists at the 2010 Winter Olympics
Olympic medalists in biathlon
Olympic bronze medalists for Slovakia
Universiade medalists in biathlon
Matej Bel University alumni
Universiade silver medalists for Slovakia
Universiade bronze medalists for Slovakia
Competitors at the 2001 Winter Universiade
Medalists at the 2003 Winter Universiade
Competitors at the 2005 Winter Universiade